Kriegsspiel is a genre of wargaming developed by the Prussian army in the 19th century to teach tactics to officers.

Kriegsspiel or Kriegspiel may also refer to:

Kriegspiel (chess), a chess variant of imperfect information
Le Jeu de la Guerre, a wargame developed by Guy Debord, discussed in his 1987 book
Kriegspiel (board wargame), an abstract board wargame developed by Avalon Hill in 1970.
"Kriegspiel", a song by Patrick Wolf from The Bachelor

German words and phrases